Summer Life is the second studio album by South African recording artist, singer-songwriter Busiswa.

The album features contributions from guest artists, including Uhuru, Dladla Mshunqisi, Cruel Boyz, KayGee The Vibe, Zingah, LaSoulMates, DJ Buckz and Gorna.

Background
Following the release of her fourth studio album Highly Flavoured (2017), Busiswa gave birth to her first child, Lukhanyo Gqulu on 8 January 2018. She took a hiatus from music in 2018 to focus on her new baby.

Gqulu announced on her social media that the album would be released on 9 November 2018, sharing the artwork of the album.

Composition
Summer Life is a Gqom album that incorporates elements of House Music and Kwaito.

Critical reception
Sabelo Mkhabela of OkayAfrica wrote that "Busiswa is back with her second album, a year after her debut Highly Flavoured. Fittingly titled Summer Life, the new album spans 10 tracks, and, as you'd expect, will make it impossible for you to listen without shaking parts of your body. Sonically, Summer Life leans towards gqom......"

Promotion
Gqulu made several television appearances and live performances in support of the album. On 9 November 2018, on the release Busiswa performed live on Live Amp. Busiswa also made appearance on uMhlobo Wenene FM radio to promote the album.

Accolades

|-
|rowspan="4"|2019
|Summer Life
|Best Kwaito/Gqom/AmaPiano Album
|
|-
|Busiswa
|Female Artist Of The Year
|
|-
|Summer Life
| Remix Of The Year
|
|}

Track listing

References

2018 albums
Gqom albums